Puvočiai is a village in Marcinkonys Eldership, Varėna district municipality, Alytus County, southeastern Lithuania. According to the 2001 census, the village had a population of 71 people. At the 2011 census, the population was 57.

Puvočiai village is located c.  from Varėna,  from Druskininkai,  from Transninkas (the nearest settlement).

References

Villages in Alytus County
Varėna District Municipality